Peik Chin Myaung (ပိတ်ချင်းမြောင်လိုဏ်ဂူ) is a limestone stalactite cave situated south of Wetwun village, 23 km from Pyin Oo Lwin, Myanmar. The cave is a tourist site on the Lashio road.

History

The cave was firstly developed by local Burmese Gurkhas and later co-opted by the Myanmar government as a tourist attraction in 1990. The cave covers an area of 45 acres, where local plants named Peik Chin, alike long pepper vine used to grow by the mouth of the cave. It is estimated to be 230 million to 310 million years old from the formation of limestone and hillocks. After the establishment of shrines with many Buddhist stupas inside the cave, it has also been called Maha Nadamu cave.

Local interest

The local people and many Myanmar pilgrims enjoyed swimming at the entrance of the cave. Many locals from Pyin Oo Lwin have shops with local products such as wine and dried game meat (ဆတ်သားခြောက်) and souvenirs for visitors.

See also

Pindaya Caves
Pyin Oo Lwin

Gallery

References 

Buddhist caves in Myanmar
Limestone caves
Buddhist temples in Mandalay